The R318 is a Regional Route in South Africa that connects the N1 between De Doorns and Touws River in the north-west with Montagu in the south-east via the Koo and Keisie Valleys.

From its northern origin, it heads south through the Rooihoogte Pass. After this pass, the route veers east through the Koo Valley then down Burgers Pass to run further east through the lower Keisie Valley. The route ends in Montagu at the R62.

References

External links
 Routes Travel Info
 Rooihoogte Pass
 Burgers Pass

Regional Routes in the Western Cape